Abdallah Omar Kigoda (25 November 1953 – 12 October 2015) was a Tanzanian CCM politician and Member of Parliament for Handeni constituency from 1995 to 2015. He served as Minister of Industry and Trade from 1996 to 1997, as Minister of Energy and Minerals from 1997 to 2000, as Minister of State in the President's Office for Planning and Privatisation from 2000 to 2005, and again as Minister of Industry and Trade from 2012 to 2015.

He overwhelmingly won the Chama Cha Mapinduzi (CCM) nomination for Handeni constituency prior to the 2005 parliamentary election, receiving 1,216 votes while the nearest of his four opponents for the nomination received 94.

He died on 12 October 2015 whilst undergoing treatment in India.

References

1953 births
2015 deaths
Chama Cha Mapinduzi MPs
Tanzanian MPs 1995–2000
Tanzanian MPs 2000–2005
Tanzanian MPs 2005–2010
Tanzanian MPs 2010–2015
Government ministers of Tanzania
Tanga Secondary School alumni
Mzumbe Secondary School alumni
University of Dar es Salaam alumni
Vanderbilt University alumni
University of Missouri alumni